Nicholas Shore (born September 26, 1992) is an American professional ice hockey center who is currently playing with HV71 of the Swedish Hockey League (SHL). He was selected in the third round (82nd overall) by the Kings in the 2011 NHL Entry Draft, and played in the National Hockey League (NHL) for the Los Angeles Kings, Ottawa Senators, Calgary Flames, Toronto Maple Leafs and Winnipeg Jets. Shore has played for multiple other teams in Europe, including HC Sibir Novosibirsk of the Kontinental Hockey League (KHL); however, after the 2022 Russian invasion of Ukraine, Shore elected to leave the team.

Playing career
As a youth, Shore played in the 2005 Quebec International Pee-Wee Hockey Tournament with a minor ice hockey team from Littleton, Colorado.

Following the 2010–11 season with the University of Denver, Shore was selected in the third round, 82nd overall by the Los Angeles Kings during the 2011 NHL Entry Draft. Shore remained at Denver for two more seasons.

On April 13, 2013, the Kings signed Shore to a three-year, entry-level contract. He spent the 2013–14 season with the Kings' American Hockey League (AHL) affiliate, the Manchester Monarchs. In his first professional season, Shore recorded 14 goals and 24 assists in 68 games.

Shore made his NHL debut on January 17, 2015, against the Anaheim Ducks. He scored his first NHL goal on March 26, 2015, in a 3–2 win over the New York Islanders.

On July 16, 2015, the Kings signed Shore to a two-year, $1.2 million contract extension. Shore's first full season with the Kings came in 2015–16, where he scored three goals in 68 games.

On July 6, 2017, the Kings signed Shore to a one-year, $925,000 contract extension.

On February 13, 2018, Shore was traded to the Ottawa Senators along with Marián Gáborík in exchange for Dion Phaneuf and Nate Thompson. Shore appeared in six games with the Senators, registering one assist, before he was traded at the trade deadline to the Calgary Flames in exchange for a seventh-round pick in the 2019 NHL Entry Draft on February 26, 2018. At the conclusion of the season, Shore was not tendered a qualifying offer and was released to free agency.

On October 12, 2018, Shore signed a one-year contract with Metallurg Magnitogorsk of the Kontinental Hockey League (KHL). In the 2018–19 season, Shore collected 13 assists and 16 points in 37 games with Metallurg in a third-line center role.

On July 24, 2019, Shore returned to the NHL as a free agent, signing a one-year $750,000 contract with the Toronto Maple Leafs. Making the Maple Leafs opening roster for the 2019–20 season, Shore made 21 appearances in a fourth-line role, registering 3 points, before he was claimed by the Winnipeg Jets after being placed on waivers by the Maple Leafs on December 4, 2019. Shore played out the remainder of the season with the Jets, continuing a fourth-line duty, and registering 3 points in 42 regular season games.

As a free agent from the Jets, and with the indefinitely delayed North American season, Shore, alongside brother Drew, opted to sign a short-term contract abroad with Slovakian club, HK Dukla Trenčín of the Tipsport Liga on November 19, 2020. In just five games with Dukla Shore collected 10 points before he returned to North America on December 3, 2020.

On January 11, 2021, Shore joined EV Zug of the National League (NL) for the remainder of the 2020–21 season.

Shore continued his career abroad, signing to play the 2021–22 season for the Russian club Sibir Novosibirsk of the Kontinental Hockey League, where he became the team's scoring leader in the regular season. Shore posted 26 points through 49 regular season games before leaving Sibir on 1 March 2022 due to the Russian invasion of Ukraine.

As a free agent in the off-season, Shore returned to Switzerland after signing a one-year contract with HC Ambrì-Piotta of the NL on July 31, 2022. Shore opened the 2022–23 season with Ambrì-Piotta, registering 2 goals and 7 points through 18 appearances before opting to leave the club and join Swedish outfit, HV71 of the SHL, for the remainder of the season on December 13, 2022.

Personal life
All three of Shore's brothers play hockey, two of them professionally. Drew is a forward for the Carolina Hurricanes of the NHL, Quentin played briefly in the American Hockey League, and Baker is a member of Harvard University. Nick, Drew and Quentin all attended the University of Denver.

Career statistics

Regular season and playoffs

International

Awards and honors

References

External links
 

1992 births
Living people
HC Ambrì-Piotta players
American men's ice hockey centers
Calgary Flames players
Denver Pioneers men's ice hockey players
HK Dukla Trenčín players
HV71 players
Ice hockey people from Denver
Los Angeles Kings draft picks
Los Angeles Kings players
Manchester Monarchs (AHL) players
Metallurg Magnitogorsk players
Ice hockey players at the 2022 Winter Olympics
Olympic ice hockey players of the United States
Ottawa Senators players
HC Sibir Novosibirsk players
Toronto Maple Leafs players
USA Hockey National Team Development Program players
Winnipeg Jets players
EV Zug players
American expatriate ice hockey players in Canada
American expatriate ice hockey players in Russia
American expatriate ice hockey players in Slovakia
American expatriate ice hockey players in Sweden
American expatriate ice hockey players in Switzerland